History of the Arabic Written Tradition (or GAL) is a reference work produced by the German scholar Carl Brockelmann and first published in two editions by Brill in Leiden in 1898 and 1902.

Publication 
The first edition of the work was first published in two volumes (1898–1902), and aimed to give a framework which divided Arabic literature into periods and subjects. However, Brockelmann later wrote a series of three Supplementbände ('supplement volumes') that vastly expanded the original work and then revised the original volumes, so the final work comprised the following:

 
 
 
 
 

Between 2016 and 2018, GAL was published by Brill in an updated English translation as History of the Arabic Written Tradition.

Influence 
The work is considered a classic of Orientalist scholarship and it remains a fundamental reference volume for all Arabic literature. Abd ar-Rahman Badawi in his Encyclopedia of Orientalists describes it as "the single and essential source for everything relating to Arabic manuscripts and the places where they are kept."

References

External links 
Full text of the original 1898-1902 edition (German)

Arabic literature
Orientalism
Reference works